Kapila Indaka Weerakkody Wijegunawardene (born 23 November 1964) is a former Sri Lankan cricketer who played in two Test matches and 26 One Day Internationals from 1988 to 1992.

In his second Test match, he claimed 7 wickets in the match. He recorded his best bowling figures in an innings by claiming 4 wickets including Imran Khan, Javed Miandad, and Salem Malik in this match.

Kapila received the opportunity to represent Sri Lanka in 1992 Cricket World Cup. He went wicket-less in the two outings he got against Zimbabwe and Pakistan.

He represented Colombo Cricket Club in domestic cricket and at international level, the selectors always considered him as a limited-over player.

Later, Kapila worked as the chairman of the selectors for Sri Lanka men's national team.

1964 births
Living people
Sri Lanka Test cricketers
Sri Lanka One Day International cricketers
Sri Lankan cricketers
Basnahira North cricketers
Colombo Cricket Club cricketers
Alumni of S. Thomas' College, Mount Lavinia